From 1871 to 1886 certain Oxford and Cambridge colleges issued their own stamps to be sold to members of the college so that they could pre-pay the cost of a college messenger delivering their mail.

The practice was stopped in 1886 by the General Post Office as it was decided that it was in contravention of its monopoly.

Issuers
The colleges which issued the stamps were:

Oxford
Keble 1871#
Merton 1876#
Hertford 1879#
Lincoln 1877
Exeter 1882#
St John's 1884
All Souls 1884
Balliol 1885 (Printed but never issued)

Cambridge
Selwyn 1882
Queens' 1883
St John's 1884

Postal stationery
Postal stationery was also used by some of the colleges listed above (post cards, envelopes) which were impressed with a pre-paid stamp. This is denoted by # above and in some cases postal stationery was in use for several years before stamps came into use, for instance at Hertford College.

References

Further reading
Sigee, David. University mails of Oxford and Cambridge 1490-1900
Lister, Raymond. College Stamps of Oxford and Cambridge
Hayman. The College Stamps of Oxford and Cambridge

Postage stamps of the United Kingdom
Oxbridge